Alfred Edwin Lord (15 October 1858 – 11 October 1905) was an Australian politician.

Lord was born in Hobart in 1858. In 1886 he was elected to the Tasmanian House of Assembly, representing the seat of Brighton, but he was defeated the following year. In 1890 he succeeded his father as the member for Cambridge in the Tasmanian Legislative Council, serving until 1897. He died in 1905 in Hobart.

References

1858 births
1905 deaths
Members of the Tasmanian House of Assembly
Members of the Tasmanian Legislative Council